Mark Rory Logan (born 28 January 1984) is a British Conservative Party politician.  He has been the Member of Parliament (MP) for Bolton North East since the 2019 general election.

Early life 
Logan was born and grew up in County Antrim, Northern Ireland. He graduated from Queen's University Belfast, and then earned two master's degrees, one from the London School of Economics and the second from Wadham College, University of Oxford. Before becoming an MP, he worked in the Foreign Office at the British Consulate-General Shanghai where he was responsible for media and communications. Logan also worked for the Chinese conglomerate Sanpower Group.

Political career 
In 2017, he contested the East Antrim seat for the Conservative Party, coming in 6th place with 2.5% of the vote. He was selected as the Conservative Party candidate for Bolton North East at the 2019 general election, ultimately winning the seat with a 0.9% majority and a swing of 4.7%.

Logan regularly campaigns for a direct train link from Bolton to London.

He is a founding member of the Parliamentary Export Programme webinar series, which seeks to help local businesses increase international sales.

Logan was appointed as Parliamentary Private Secretary to the Northern Ireland Office in March 2022. He resigned on 6 July 2022 in protest at Boris Johnson's conduct in the Chris Pincher scandal, calling his position "almost impossible".

Electoral history

2019 general election

2017 general election

References

External links

Living people
UK MPs 2019–present
Place of birth missing (living people)
Conservative Party (UK) MPs for English constituencies
Alumni of Wadham College, Oxford
Alumni of the London School of Economics
Alumni of Queen's University Belfast
People from County Antrim
Civil servants in the Foreign Office
1984 births